Cannibal is a steel roller coaster located at Lagoon amusement park in Farmington, Utah. It opened with the tallest beyond-vertical drop in the world on July 2, 2015, and its drop angle of 116 degrees was the steepest in the United States for a brief time. A large portion of the $22-million ride was built and designed in-house, a rare move for an amusement park. Since its debut, Cannibal has also consistently ranked in the top 50 among steel roller coasters worldwide in the annual Golden Ticket Awards publication from Amusement Today.

History
Nearly 75% of Cannibal was designed, engineered, and manufactured in-house by Lagoon amusement park with the help of multiple firms located in Utah. The lead designer was Lagoon's Dal Freeman. In an era when most amusement parks outsource the work to a select few established roller coaster manufacturers, the decision to build in-house is rare in the industry. The roller coaster features a  enclosed  elevator lift, a beyond-vertical drop of 116 degrees, a themed underground tunnel, and a 360-degree helix situated above a man-made waterfall. It also features four inversions that include a  Immelman loop, a dive loop, and a unique inversion the park calls the "Lagoon roll," which consists of a counter-clockwise heartline roll immediately followed by a clockwise heartline roll.

The ride had been in the planning stages for more than five years and required more than two years to construct. Prior to its planned opening in the spring of 2015, Lagoon announced that the roller coaster's debut would be postponed for additional testing and inspections. The ride officially opened on July 2, 2015. At the time of opening, Cannibal set a world record for having the tallest beyond-vertical drop among roller coasters, and became the steepest in the United States. Its drop angle record in the US was surpassed by TMNT Shellraiser, which opened at Nickelodeon Universe in 2019.

Ride experience
The roller coaster features a  elevator lift, enclosed in a huge tower structure; a 116° beyond vertical drop; inversions, including an Immelman-like loop, as well as an inversion unique to the park consisting of two consecutive heart line rolls (commonly referred to as a "Lagoon Roll") in opposite directions; a water feature; and a tunnel  underground. It is the tallest roller coaster in the state and the longest ride in the park. The ride cars accommodate 12 passengers (3 rows of 4), and the duration of the ride lasts approximately two and a half minutes.

Reception
The ride appeared in Amusement Today's Golden Ticket Awards for the first time in 2016, ranking 42nd among steel roller coasters.

References

External links

Lagoon (amusement park)
Roller coasters introduced in 2015
2015 establishments in Utah